The Punisher: The Album is the official soundtrack for the film The Punisher and was released in 2004 by Wind-up Records. Its two lead singles were "Broken" by Seether and Evanescence frontwoman Amy Lee and "Step Up" by Drowning Pool, which have accompanying music videos.

Track listing
Credits adapted from the album's liner notes.

Certifications

References

External links
 IMDB

Marvel Comics film soundtracks
Punisher in music
2004 soundtrack albums
2000s film soundtrack albums
Wind-up Records soundtracks
Post-grunge albums
Hard rock soundtracks
Alternative metal albums
Nu metal albums
The Punisher (2004 film)